The banded palm civet (Hemigalus derbyanus), also called banded civet, is a viverrid native to Myanmar, Peninsular Malaysia, peninsular Thailand and the Sunda Islands of Sipura, Sumatra and Borneo. It is listed as Near Threatened on the IUCN Red List because of its large geographic and elevation range and tolerance to some habitat disturbance.

Hemigalus is a monospecific genus that was first named and described by Claude Jourdan in 1837.

Characteristics 

The banded palm civet has a long pointed face, reminiscent of insectivorous mammals. It has a long body set on short legs, and five toes on each foot with retractable claws. It looks very similar to Owston's palm civet (Chrotogale owstoni), except that it lacks spots on its body, and the hair on its neck points upwards instead of down along the neck. It is also similar to the rare Hose's palm civet (Diplogale hosei), an endemic of northern Borneo - they only differ in shape of muzzle and teeth and Hose's civet does not have the banded pelage of the banded civet. The banded civet has short, dense fur that is generally a dark cream/buff color with four to five dark bands on its back. Its tail has two dark bands and the latter half of the tail is dark brown to black. There is a dark brown stripe that extends down the length of the top of the muzzle, and two stripes that extend from the top middle of the eye to the inside corner of the ears. There are two areas of white above and below each eye, and the muzzle is darker than the rest of the face.

Having roughly the size of a domestic cat, this viverrid measures from 41 to 51 cm in total length, and weights from 1 to 3 kg (2.2 to 6.6 lbs).

Distribution and habitat 
Though it lives in the forests, it spends much of its time on the ground.

References

Viverrids
Carnivorans of Asia
Mammals of Southeast Asia
Mammals of Borneo
Mammals of Thailand
Mammals of Indonesia
Carnivorans of Malaysia
Fauna of Sumatra
Mammals described in 1837
Taxa named by John Edward Gray
Near threatened animals
Near threatened biota of Asia